Svend Soot von Düring (7 July 1915 – 7 June 1969) was a Norwegian actor.

He was a son of entertainer Botten Soot. He was a great-grandson of Engebret Soot and grandson of Eyolf Soot and Inga Bjørnson. His grandmother's second husband's child was Svend's half-aunt: Guri Stormoen. His mother was married twice.

He made his stage debut in 1933 at Søilen Teater. He was employed at Chat Noir from 1933 to 1936, and later at Trøndelag Teater and Den Nationale Scene. He also performed on the screen.

References

1915 births
1969 deaths
Norwegian male stage actors
Norwegian male film actors
20th-century Norwegian male actors